The South Tahoma Glacier is a glacier located on the southwest flank of Mount Rainier in State of Washington. The smaller South Tahoma is connected to the Tahoma at an ice patch located in midway down the South Tahoma. Meltwater from the glacier drains into the Nisqually River.

Debris flows
The glacier is one of four on Mount Rainier that are known to have released debris flows. Similar flows have stemmed from the Nisqually, Kautz, and Winthrop glaciers as well. The glacier has at least 23 recorded debris flows since 1967, with 15 reported between the years 1986 and 1992. The floods have caused damage and disruption to the roads and picnic areas downstream. In August 2015, a debris flow was caused by a glacial outburst flood when meltwater was released by the glacier. Part of the Westside Road was damaged by the debris flow.

History
The South Tahoma Glacier is the site of the worst accident to have occurred on the slopes of Mount Rainier.  In December 1946, 32 U.S. Marines were killed in a Curtiss R5C Commando military aircraft when it crashed into the glacier at the 10,500 foot (3,200 m) level in what was then the worst aviation accident in U.S. history.  While much of the wreckage and 25 bodies were located during several recovery attempts throughout the following year, only small artifacts were recovered, including several Marines' medical records.  The bodies and wreckage are presumably still buried in the glacier today.

See also
Tahoma Glacier
List of glaciers

References

Glaciers of Mount Rainier
Glaciers of Washington (state)